The 1939 Liga de Lima, the first tier of the league of Lima and Callao of Peruvian football (soccer), was played by 11 teams. The tournament winner, Alianza Lima was promoted to the Promotional Playoff against San Carlos (Callao league's champion). From 1931 until 1942 the points system was  W:3, D:2, L:1, walkover:0.

Results

Liga Provincial de Lima

Liga Provincial del Callao

Promotion playoff

References
 Del Callao al Potao (in Spanish)

 

Peruvian Segunda División seasons
Peru2
2